Daniel C. Oakes High School is a public school located in Castle Rock, Colorado. The school is a part of Douglas County School District RE-1. It has 161 students and has courses from grades 9–12.

The school was founded in the year 1986. Derek Fleshman is the principal of the school.

References

Alternative schools in the United States
Public high schools in Colorado
Education in Douglas County, Colorado